Francesco Vettori (1474–1539) was an Italian diplomat, politician and writer from Florence. He served his city  during both the republican and the de Medici regimes. He is remembered chiefly as one of the main personal correspondents of Niccolò Machiavelli, but he also published some small works himself in the same period.

Vettori's correspondence with Machiavelli includes some of the only surviving written discussions about the writing of Machiavelli's "little work", which was to become The Prince. The correspondence is considered to be amongst the most well known in Italian.

Other works by Vettori are a Sommario della istoria d'Italia ("Summary of the History of Italy") and a collection of stories called Viaggio in Alamagna ("Journey in Germany").

References

. Translated and edited by James B. Atkinson and David Sices.
.

1474 births
1539 deaths
Politicians from Florence
16th-century Italian historians
16th-century people of the Republic of Florence
Diplomats from Florence
Italian Renaissance writers
16th-century Italian diplomats
16th-century Italian writers
16th-century male writers
Writers from Florence